BTO or bto may refer to:

Places
 Bhitaura railway station (station code BTO), Fatehganj Pashchimi, Bareilly, Uttar Pradesh, India
 Botopasi Airstrip (IATA airport code: BTO), Botopasi, Suriname

Chemicals, drugs, substances
 Barium titanate (formally BaTiO), a compound with the formula BaTiO3
 Bismuth titanate (formally BiTiO), a set of compounds with varying formulae [ Bi12TiO20 or Bi4Ti3O12 or Bi2Ti2O7 ]

Groups, organizations, companies
 Bachman–Turner Overdrive, a Canadian rock band
 British Trust for Ornithology
 Brussels Treaty Organisation, an organisation established to implement the 1948 Treaty of Brussels

Other uses
 BRENDA tissue ontology, an encyclopedia of enzyme sources
 Build to order, an order-fulfillment strategy
 Build to order (HDB), a purchasing arrangement for new Singapore Housing Development Board apartments 
 Rinconada Bikol language (ISO 639-3 language code: bto)

See also

 
 
 
 
 
 B2 (disambiguation)